Numerous narratives and folk beliefs make up the ghostlore of Indiana, a U.S. state in the Midwest, and there are many locations that are considered to be haunted by locals. Some of the hauntings are celebrated in festivals, and most have some history behind them.

Angola theatre
The town of Angola, Indiana has several locations where residents have claimed to have sighted specters. An old theatre sits on the town circle, and some residents claim that at midnight a man with a long red beard appears on the roof of the building pacing back and forth and cries aloud, "Marie please come back to me, please." Movie goers also say that sometimes during movies you can hear a man sobbing in the back of the theatre, but when you look, no one is there.

Fowler Theatre
Located in the town of Fowler, Indiana is the Fowler Theatre. The Historic Fowler Theatre is known for its beautifully restored Art Deco look and feel, but beyond the ornate, outward appearance, there is a history of mysterious noises, shadows and strange activity.

Haunted bridges
In the town of Avon, Indiana stands a railroad bridge constructed across the White Lick Creek in the 1850s by immigrant Irish workers. Designed by engineer W.M. Dunne, cement was mixed in large narrow vats and hardened into the form of a pylon. According to local legend, while working on the bridge a platform collapsed and a worker fell into the cement vat. As he slowly sank down into the vat, his fellow workers could not reach him in time and they had no way to save him. They could hear him knocking from the inside of the vat. The company decided to continue building rather than tear down the pylon to extract his body.

While the men finished the work on the bridge, and for years afterward, many claimed to hear knocks and screams from inside the pylon. Decades later, when the bridge was torn down, there were a number of sightings of a man wandering along the tracks trying to flag down trains.
The haunted bridge is on the official seal to Avon, Indiana.  The Big Four Railroad, lifeblood of the connecting arteries in Central Indiana and beyond, required a bridge spanning Country Road 625 and White Lick Creek, so the bridge was built in 1906-1907 and double-tracked in 1908. It is about 300 feet long and 70 feet high, an imposing structure whose image graces the Avon town seal today.

The legend of Avon's Haunted Bridge has been around for generations. According to locals, those who get near the bridge report hearing moaning, whispering, and pleading sounds. And if you cross the bridge on a hot summer day, you may see the ghost of the worker's tears on the bridge.

There are various explanations for the hauntings. No one, of course, knows whether they are being carried out by a single ghost or many. Over the years, some theories have come to be popular regarding who the ghosts might be. A few of the most widely accepted versions are summarized below.

Henry Johnson, an alcoholic construction worker, slipped one night during the building of the bridge and fell into some wet cement, dying there in the lonely night. The following morning he was found, face frozen in the cement that killed him.

There is a similar report that another construction worker fell to his death during the making of the bridge. He landed inside the framework of one of the bridge's supports. The railroad decided that, since the unfortunate laborer was already dead, they would simply inter his body in the bridge when they sealed the support with cement. Some say that the poor man's arm hung out, and they cut it off.

Perhaps, as some Avon residents aver, the ghosts on the Haunted Bridge belong to a young woman and her baby. The story goes that she was walking to the doctor's house late one night with her sick baby when she had the bad luck to get her foot caught among the railroad ties on the bridge. Then, disaster struck in the form of a huge locomotive barreling down on them. She struggled mightily, finally getting free of the railroad ties, but had no time to run across the bridge to escape the train. So, clutching her sick child, she jumped off the bridge. She survived, but the baby, falling from her arms, did not. Within a few weeks, the mother died of grief and a broken heart. The story concludes that if you drive under the bridge at night, you might very well hear her screaming for her baby.

The haunted bridge in Avon is still a functional railroad crossing, servicing the CSX Railroad, and regularly visited by residents and guests to get spine-tingling adrenaline rush.

Located in Clinton Falls, Indiana over Little Walnut Creek, the Edna Collins Bridge is said to be haunted by the ghost of a little girl. Built in 1922 by Charles Hendrix, the Burr Arch bridge stands as the shortest covered bridge in the county its located - Putnam County, Indiana. Originally built to replace a concrete bridge that became overwhelmed by water and eventually washed out, the Burr Arch bridge gained its notoriety through the haunted experiences locals have encountered while crossing the bridge.

Local legend claims that the bridge is haunted by a woman and her child. A child named Edna Collins enjoyed playing in the creek underneath the bridge with her dog, and was often left unaccompanied at the site. When her parents arrived by car to the bridge to bring her home, they would honk their horn three times to notify the girl that it was time to leave. One day, while she had been left to play, her parents honked their horn three times and she did not arrive at her usual pick-up location. Worried, the parents decided to search the area for their missing daughter. When they looked underneath the bridge she was known to play at - she was found to have drowned. Circumstances surrounding her death have never been clarified.

Variations of the story concerning her family post-death exist but none are confirmed. Some say that the mother became so distraught by the event, that she hung herself. Others claim that her father constructed the bridge after the fact, to honor his daughter's death.

According to legend, in order to summon Edna Collins, individuals must drive into the Edna Collins bridge, turn off their engine, then honk three times to summon the ghost. Many report hearing a childlike laugh, seeing fingerprints on their car, and seeing shadowy figures that seem to represent a child. Others claim that in order to summon the mother, you must retrieve a piece of rope hanging from a nearby church. Then, you must cross onto the bridge to summon Edna Collin's mother.

Edna Collins bridge has become a subject of tourism despite its function as a covered bridge, and is one of 9 within Putnam County.

Diana of the Dunes

One of the most well known, and most celebrated ghost legends in Indiana is that of Diana of the Dunes.
 Near Chesterton, Indiana, in the Indiana Dunes, there is a legend that fisherman around Lake Michigan would occasionally sight a naked woman swimming in the lake. The legend dates back to at least 1915, and goes on to say that a beautiful woman was living as a hermit near the lake. Because no one knew her name they began to refer to her as Dianne, because of her beauty. In actuality, she was Alice Mable Gray, the daughter of a wealthy Chicago family, who had come to live on the dunes after she began to lose her eyesight. She had grown up near the dunes, and sought to enjoy the remainder of her life there. In 1920 a man named Paul Wilson moved into the cabin with her. He was an unemployed boatwright, and a suspected murderer. The two eventually married, but he began to treat her badly, and was abusive. She died shortly after the birth of their second child from being poisoned.

The local legend claims that Alice's ghost still returns to the beach at the dunes to relive her happier days. For decades there have been sightings of a naked ghostly looking woman running along the beach and disappearing into the lake. The legend is commonly referred to as Diana of the Dunes. The story is commemorated in an annual Diana of the Dunes Festival and Pageant.

Culbertson Mansion

In New Albany, Indiana there is a large mansion from the town's boom days as a ship building center. The Culbertson Mansion is open to public tours, and visitors and the curators have claimed to have seen a ghostly figure in the building. They believe her to be the ghost of the owner's second wife who returned to protect her children from her husband's third wife. The mansion's carriage barn is turned into a haunted house during Halloween, and many tour the building then in hopes of sighting the ghosts.

Nearby the mansion is the carriage house. The following is a storyline for the current "Literally, A Haunted House" fundraiser, which raises the majority of the funds for interior restoration of the mansion.

Whitcomb's library
Former Indiana Governor James Whitcomb donated his vast library to Ashbury University—now DePauw University—in his will after his death in 1852. Whitcomb was an avid reader and had amassed a large collection of books in his lifetime, and kept almost every book he had ever read. During the years his library was in public use there were numerous sighting of Whitcomb's ghost trying to protect his books. In one notable incident, a boy had supposedly borrowed The Poems of Ossian from the library. That night, Whitcomb's ghost appeared in his room wailing, "'Ossian! Who stole the Ossian". The next day the boy immediately returned the book to the library and told about the experience. The collection of now rare books is now protected, but there are still occasional sightings of Whitcomb's ghost.

Willard Library
The Willard Library in Evansville is reportedly haunted.  The library hosts a webcam for visitors to capture images looking for the ghost.  It also hosts a ghost tour in October.

References

Sources

Indiana culture
Indiana, Ghost legends of
Reportedly haunted locations in Indiana